Omar El Said (born 23 June 1990) is an Egyptian professional footballer who plays as a striker for Egyptian Premier League club Future and the Egypt national team. El Said scored 5 goals in the first 4 matches in 2017–18 Egyptian Premier League season, which made him on the top of scorers' list so far.

International career
He made his debut for the Egypt national football team on 14 October 2019 in a friendly against Botswana.

Honours
Zamalek

Egyptian Premier League: 2020-21-2021-22
Saudi-Egyptian Super Cup: 2018
 CAF Confederation Cup: 2018–19
Egypt Cup: 2018–19 , 2021
Egyptian Super Cup: 2019–20
 CAF Super Cup: 2020

References

External links

Living people
1990 births
Egyptian footballers
Egypt international footballers
Egyptian Premier League players
Association football forwards
El Gouna FC players
Misr Lel Makkasa SC players
El Entag El Harby SC players
Wadi Degla SC players